Mrs. Finnegan is an Australian situation comedy series which screened on the Seven Network in 1970 to 1971. It followed a widow and her son living in a Sydney suburb.

Cast
 Delore Whiteman as Jessie Finnegan
 Reg Gorman as  Darby Finnegan
 Max Cullen as Hilton Harper
 Penny Ramsey as Fay Smith
 Marion Johns as Amy Frizell

See also 
 List of Australian television series

Notes

External links 
 

Australian television sitcoms
Seven Network original programming
Television shows set in New South Wales
1970 Australian television series debuts
1971 Australian television series endings
Black-and-white Australian television shows